Dmitri Klimovich (born 30 April 1972) is a retired Belarusian football defender.

He capped for USSR U-20 team at 1991 FIFA World Youth Championship. Klimovich played in one match for the Belarus B team, a friendly against Lithuania in 1992.

Honours
Dinamo Minsk
Belarusian Premier League champion: 1992, 1992, 1992–93, 1993–94
Belarusian Cup winner: 1992, 1993–94

References

External links

1972 births
Living people
Soviet footballers
Belarusian footballers
Belarusian Premier League players
FC Dinamo Minsk players
FC Dinamo-93 Minsk players
FC Dnepr Mogilev players
Association football defenders